The 2011 Mid-Ohio Sports Car Challenge was held at Mid-Ohio Sports Car Course on August 5, 2011. It was the fifth round of the 2011 American Le Mans Series season.

Qualifying

Qualifying Result
Pole position winners in each class are marked in bold.

Race
The race was red flagged with around 10 minutes to go due to heavy rain conditions. Team Falken Tire had very good wet weather tires which earned them their first win in ALMS. Driver Wolf Henzler was fifth in class before the rain started falling and made his way up to first place in just one lap.

Race result
Class winners in bold.  Cars failing to complete 70% of their class winner's distance are marked as Not Classified (NC).

References

Mid-Ohio
Sports Car Challenge of Mid-Ohio
2011 in sports in Ohio